The Battle of Hurricane Bridge was a Civil War battle fought in Hurricane, West Virginia on March 28, 1863, preceding the Jones-Imboden Raid. After being defeated, the Confederates continued on to Point Pleasant, attacking the town in search of munitions and supplies. The Battle of Hurricane Bridge directly contributed to the Union Army maintaining control of the James River and Kanawha Turnpike, a key supply line, and enabled Federal control of the Kanawha Valley for the remainder of the war.

References

Battles of the American Civil War in West Virginia
1863 in West Virginia
March 1863 events